Ulf Georg Georgsson (born 22 April 1962 in Kinna Parish in former Älvsborg County, Sweden), is a Swedish songwriter, who has participated at Melodifestivalen as a songwriter, and written songs recorded by, among other, Lasse Stefanz, Vikingarna, Playtones, Drifters, Zekes, CC & Lee, Black Jack, Barbados, Friends and Frøya.

As a musician he plays the drums in Flamingokvintetten since June 2013, after 30 years in Bhonus.

At Svensktoppen he became the second most successful composer in the year 2000, and was appointed "composer of the year" in 2001.

References

1962 births
Living people
Swedish drummers
Male drummers
Swedish songwriters